South Korean boy band Big Bang have released twenty-seven concerts video albums, forty music videos, four music video compilations, and one documentary DVD. The group has sold over a million physical DVDs/Blu-rays in Japan.

Music videos

As lead artist

Collaborations

Video albums

Concert tour videos

Documentaries

Music video compilations

Other releases

Featured releases

Filmography

Documentaries

Drama parodies

Reality shows

See also
 Big Bang discography

References

Videography
Videographies of South Korean artists